The Tower Theatre, located in the 9th and 9th neighborhood of Salt Lake City, Utah, is a historic film theater operated by the Salt Lake Film Society. The theater (with the Broadway Centre Cinemas, also owned by the society) presents independent films. It also presents classic films on occasional weekends.

The theater was built by Samuel Campbell in late 1927 and opened January 10, 1928. At a cost of $40,000 and boasted a $10,000 Kilgen Wonder Organ for its opening. The theater converted to sound Films on January 10, 1930, two years to the day of its grand opening, and became known as "Tower Talkies". It is the oldest movie theater in the Salt Lake Valley that is still in operation today. It was the first air-conditioned movie theater in the city. Its original facade resembled the Tower of London, but this was removed in 1950.

The theatre is a venue for the Sundance Film Festival, and hosts a movie-rental library.

References

External links
Official website
Historic Theaters of Salt Lake City

Buildings and structures in Salt Lake City
Cinemas and movie theaters in Utah
Event venues established in 1928
Sundance Film Festival
Theatres completed in 1928
Tourist attractions in Salt Lake City
1928 establishments in Utah